Clubbed to Death (also known as Lola or Clubbed to Death (Lola)) is a 1997 French film starring Élodie Bouchez,  directed by Yolande Zauberman, and co-written by Zauberman and Noémie Lvovsky. The film concerns a love triangle that forms between 20-year-old Lola (Bouchez) and the couple she encounters at an all-night rave.

References

Further reading

External links 
 

1997 films
French drama films
1990s French films